Gabriel Ernesto Núñez D´Alessandro (born 24 January 1994) is a Salvadoran-born Dominican footballer, who plays as a midfielder for Cibao FC and the Dominican Republic national team.

International career
Born and raised in El Salvador, Núñez qualified to play for the Dominican Republic through his mother. He made his senior debut for the Dominican Republic national football team in a 3-0 win against Saint Lucia on 12 October 2019.

References

External links
 
 
 

1994 births
Living people
Citizens of the Dominican Republic through descent
Dominican Republic footballers
Association football midfielders
Querétaro F.C. footballers
Associação Naval 1º de Maio players
Cibao FC players
Campeonato de Portugal (league) players
Dominican Republic international footballers
Dominican Republic people of Salvadoran descent
Sportspeople of Salvadoran descent
Dominican Republic people of Italian descent
Sportspeople of Italian descent
Dominican Republic expatriate footballers
Dominican Republic expatriate sportspeople in Mexico
Expatriate footballers in Mexico
Dominican Republic expatriate sportspeople in Portugal
Expatriate footballers in Portugal
People from Santa Tecla, El Salvador
Salvadoran footballers
Salvadoran Primera División players
Salvadoran people of Dominican Republic descent
Salvadoran people of Italian descent
Salvadoran expatriate footballers
Salvadoran expatriate sportspeople in Mexico
Salvadoran expatriate sportspeople in Portugal
G.D. Gafanha players
Liga Dominicana de Fútbol players